Råket is a village in Smøla Municipality in Møre og Romsdal county, Norway.  It is located on the northwestern part of the island of Smøla, just west of the village of Dyrnes. Brattvær Church is located just south of the village.

Together with the nearby village of Dyrnes, it constituted the urban area Dyrnesvågen, which had a population in 2003 of 257. Since 2004 Dyrnesvågen is not considered an urban settlement by Statistics Norway, and its data is therefore not registered.

References

Villages in Møre og Romsdal
Smøla